Feng Yanzhe (born 13 February 2001) is a Chinese badminton player. He was part of Chinese national team that won the 2018 World Junior Championships and 2021 Sudirman Cup. He also won the mixed doubles title at the 2019 World Junior Championships.

Career 
Feng was born in Tianjin. He started playing badminton at the age of 5 and joined the Beijing team in 2009.

In October 2019, Feng played with the Chinese team in the World Junior Championships in Kazan, Russia, winning the silver medal in the mixed team event, and won the gold in the mixed doubles with partner Lin Fangling.

In October 2021, Feng helped the Chinese national team to win the Sudirman Cup.

Achievements

BWF World Junior Championships 
Mixed doubles

Asian Junior Championships 
Boys' doubles

Mixed doubles

BWF World Tour (3 titles, 2 runners-up)
The BWF World Tour, which was announced on 19 March 2017 and implemented in 2018, is a series of elite badminton tournaments sanctioned by the Badminton World Federation (BWF). The BWF World Tour is divided into levels of World Tour Finals, Super 1000, Super 750, Super 500, Super 300, and the BWF Tour Super 100.

Mixed doubles

References

External links 
 

2001 births
Living people
Badminton players from Tianjin
Chinese male badminton players
21st-century Chinese people